Shafiq Sher Afridi is a Pakistani politician who had been a member of the Provincial Assembly of Khyber Pakhtunkhwa from August 2019 till January 2023.

Political career
Afridi contested 2019 Khyber Pakhtunkhwa provincial election on 20 July 2019 from constituency PK-105 (Khyber-I) as an independent. He won the election by the majority of 11,368 votes over the runner up Shermat Khan, also an independent. He garnered 18,135 votes while Khan received 6,767 votes.

References

Living people
Independent MPAs (Khyber Pakhtunkhwa)
Politicians from Khyber Pakhtunkhwa
Year of birth missing (living people)